The Rare and Exotic Feline Registry (REFR) is a cat registry founded in 1984. The organization specializes in cats "derived from (or alleged to derive from) hybrids with wildcat species". It has recognized unique breeds including the Desert Lynx, Highland Lynx, Alpine Lynx, American Lynx, Mojave Spotted, and Bramble. When the original owner died, the registry was sold to a southern California cat breeder.

REFR is a "paper registry only" and is not recognized by any of the major cat associations, such as TICA (The International Cat Association) or CFA (Cat Fanciers' Association). REFR will register any cat for US$10–20.   the North Carolina Secretary of State provides no record of a licensed business by this name (officially or as an assumed business name) in the state.

References

External links
 

1984 establishments in North Carolina
Cat registries